Fischells is a community in Newfoundland and Labrador. It was mostly evacuated during the resettlement programmes of over 40 years ago, but a small group remained in the settlement clustered at the southern side of the mouth of Fischells Brook.

Ghost towns in Newfoundland and Labrador